Juana la Macarrona (May 3, 1870 – April 17, 1947) was a Spanish flamenco dancer (bailaora). 

Born Juana Vargas de las Heras in Jerez de la Frontera in Andalusia, she later added the stage name La Macarrona. Her Gitano parents started her on her dancing career, which lasted well into the twentieth century.

Renown as bailaora

Early career

Her mother was Ramona de las Heras Valencia, a flamenco singer, her father Juan de Vargas Barrío, a flamenco guitarist. At the age of seven Juana began dancing in the streets to their accompaniment, hers being a flamenco family. Among Juana's gypsy ancestors was Josefa Vargas, also a bailaora. More distant ancestors were among the earliest flamenco performers known. María Vargas, Juana's sister, was the lesser-known dancer María La Macarrona. Juana landed her first regular job at a café cantante in Sevilla, but she earned more in the streets by the equivalent of "passing the hat". Later she danced beside the singer El Mezcle at a flamenco café in Málaga.

At about the age of 16 Juana was "discovered" by Silverio Franconetti, the legendary flamenco cantaor, at whose Café Silverio in Sevilla she then danced. Quickly La Macarrona became a well-known bailaora throughout Spain, dancing in company with the best flamenco performers (singers, dancers, guitarists) at well-known café cantantes. By the early 1890s Juana was appearing at illustrious venues in Paris, and elsewhere in Europe. Entertained were several "zares de Russia", a "shah de Persia", various "reyes, principes y duques", as well as "señoríos" and "comerciantes". La Macarrona performed her baile at the 1889 Exposition Universelle in Paris. Not yet thirty, she had attracted wealth and fame.

Her flamenco style
From reports of her performances, La Macarrona followed a style then considered traditional. Her baile directed attention to the upper torso, with movements of the arms and of the hands. These brazos y manos she did knowingly, aware, with a delightful ease she displayed her strength. The bata de cola she moved beautifully, impeccably. According to a flamenco writer, her zapateado accents were dramatic and sharp.

About the footwork then current among flamenco bailaoras, there is a disputed issue. Some assert that today the zapateado is more developed, others disagree. A contemporary describes her spell over an audience.

The people are silent, holding their breaths with an almost religious fervor, while the feet of La Macarrona give rhythm to her dance. The chords of the guitar have little value now. Because La Macarrona dances to the compás of her own magnificent footwork."

Juana Vargas la Macarrona "poseía una asombrosa flexibilidad en los movimientos del cuerpo y dominaba el manejo de la bata de cola que enroscaba a sus pies después de dar las vueltas con encreíble maestría." She favored the soleares, the alegrías, and bailes "festeros" (festive dances). By eye-witness accounts La Macarrona was "a fireball, her dance full of gypsy temperament."  It is said "her duende was exceptional."

Personality
She also became known to aficionados for quotable, impromptu expressions. For example, after performing with flamencos often in Paris Juana had become familiar with speaking French. On a later trip north from Spain, she was asked to make arrangements when the train reached Paris. Upon arrival, for whatever reason, nobody seemed able to understand her. She explained, "It's not that my French isn't good, it's just that they've changed the damned language since I was here last."

The crown of fame
La reina
In the flamenco cafés she remained much in demand for decades, the performance star among bailaoras. Juana "es la que hace muchos años reina en el arte de bailer flamenco". In particular at the Cafe Novedades in Sevilla for fifteen years she held sway, setting the pace, defining the art. When La Macarrona 'consented' to dance, she might arise from her place like a queen of Sheba, sovereign, knowing, riding the music, proud of her art, perhaps too proud. As she raised her arms above her head it was as if favoring the world with the sight of her baile. Her vital moves elicited 'lightning and thunder'.

Ballets Russses in Sevilla

Her reputation in international dance was correspondingly high, no less in the world of ballet and classical music. Four well-known traveling companions saw her dance, circa 1917: the impresario Serge Diaghilev, the composer Manuel de Falla, the choreographer and dancer Léonide Massine, and the bailaor Felix Fernandez García. "In Seville we went to see Ramirez and Macarrona, the two outstanding flamenco dancers of the day. Their dancing more than lived up to our expectations, and we were dazzled by the ferocious power and elegance of their performance."Cf. Lynn Garafola, Diaghilev's Ballets Russes (Oxford University, 1989), pp. 88–90, at 89. The "Ramirez" mentioned with La Macarrona is probably Antonio López Ramírez or "Ramirito" (1885–1930).

La poesía
On stage her elusive movements drew rapt attention, almost reverence from many audiences. She attracted poetic lines. Radiant was her stage presence, her rhythmic grace fluid. With her turns of emotional intensity, and her sudden stillness, she'd conjure a fragrance of roses. La Macarrona "le injertó al baile una antiquísima fuerza emotiva, llena de feminidad y gracia, como en los soleares de su creación. ... Y por la cintura, por los brazos, le subía el chorro de la danza... ."

Her stage name

La Macarrona was her stage name of Juana Vargas. The name is said to be taken from two flamenco ancestors of Juana Vargas. Each named Macarrón, they flourished in the 18th century: Tío Juan Macarrón and Tío Vicente Macarrón. Juana's family was long accustomed to performing the flamenco arts. Her namesake Tío Juan Macarrón of Jerez de la Frontera is described as being a cantaor (flamenco singer) of 18th-century Spain and "Uno de más antiguos intérpreters conocidos" (One of the earliest flamenco interpreters known). Of another of her namesakes, Tío Vicente Maccarón, an equal antiquity and rôle is referenced.

Macarrona in English would mean "macaroni or macaroon". In addition to the foods, the word "macaroni" in 18th century England also signified an "English dandy... who affected foreign mannerisms and fashions." This second meaning originally derived from Italian, and is retained in the Spanish cognate "macarronea" [English: "macarronic"], which currently is defined as "burlesque verse" mixing "real or coined words from two or more languages." So that, if in itself it carries a meaning in addition to family ancestry, La Macarrona could mean "exotic talker", analogous to how she dances, also fitting her knack for off-stage humor. La Macarrona could advertise her being a "dandy" of the flamenco arts.

Later years in flamenco

Juana la Macarrona when fifty (in 1910) established a permanent home in Sevilla. In 1922 she was a judge at the Concurso de Cante Jondo in Granada (see below). In 1931 Juana danced in the motion picture Violetas Imperiales directed by Henry Roussel. In a trio of elder dancers, Juana performed on stage in the 1933 El Amor Brujo. Also in 1933, and in 1940, she toured with the stage show Las Calles de Cádiz.

She was able to extend her dancing career well past sixty. 
"Such was her dominance in the dance that in the 1920s, when she was in her sixties, she still drew crowds as a headliner in the major cabarets of Sevilla and Madrid."  In part, however, she performed out of necessity, caused by the loss of much of her wealth in a house break-in. Stolen was a small fortune in "cash and jewels". Eventually, however, her cafés-cantantes  era fame had faded; she then mostly performed in colmaos (flamenco taverns) and ventas in Sevilla. "Occasionally benefits would be held in her honor".

When she was seventy-five, she gave a newspaper interview in Sevilla. She lamented the decline of flamenco. "Ni en los cafés nos quieren ya, cuando hemos sío siempre las reinas der mundo. Pero to lo acaba er tiempo."

La Macarrona had taught "droves" of younger dancers. Among them was Teresita España, who she considered turned out the best. Also her student was Florencia Pérez Padilla, the Rosario of the performing pair "Rosario and Antonio". She is "appraised by many as the greatest female flamenco dancer of all times. Others claim she was the greatest of her epoch."

Reference notes

See also
Flamenco dance
Carmen Amaya
Silverio Franconetti
Café Cantante
Concurso de Cante Jondo: Events of the Concurso
La Argentina
La Argentinita
Women in dance

External links
 Juana la Macarrona at website El Arte de vivir el flamenco, article in Spanish, with photographs.
 Juana la Macarrona at Flamenco World, article in Spanish, with photograph.
 K. Meira Goldberg, "Juana Vargas 'La Macarrona': A flamenco treasure" (New York Public Library 2015). Photographs and text.
 :es:Juana la Macarrona a Wikipedia, La enciclopedia libre.

1870 births
1947 deaths
Flamenco dancers
Spanish female dancers
People from Jerez de la Frontera
19th-century Spanish dancers